Gazetted officers include all the Indian Police Service officers which are Class I officers of the cadre and all State Police Services officers of and above the rank of Deputy Superintendent of Police. All are arranged in a hierarchical order.

Ranks of law enforcement in India
The ranks, posts and designations of all police officers vary from state to state as law and order is a state matter. But, generally the following pattern is observed:

Gazetted Officers

Non-gazetted officers

Organisational structure and roles

Overview
Law enforcement in India is a state matter. Hence, policing structure varies from state to state. But there is a general structure observed.

Ministry of Home Affairs
The Ministry of Home Affairs is in overall charge of internal as well as external security and policing, and is the controlling authority for the Indian Police Service (IPS). The Home Secretary, the administrative head of the MHA, is an IAS officer in the rank of Secretary to Government of India. The ministry has jurisdiction over the seven Central Armed Police Forces. The state home ministry has charge of the IPS officers in its state.

The Indian Police Service is not a law enforcement organization, but a professional body of police officers. Police officers may enter the IPS by two different routes:
 Regular recruits. IPS candidates may apply at the central level by taking the national exam administered by the Union Public Service Commission; if successful, they are given the probationary rank of assistant superintendent and receive further training at the Sardar Vallabhbhai Patel National Police Academy. After completion of their training, officers still hold the rank of assistant superintendent and wear three silver stars as insignia for a year before being promoted to the rank of Deputy Superintendent of Police and sent to the cadre which is allotted to them after training in the academy.
 State-level selection. Candidates may take a state-level examination for State Police Service (SPS) gazetted officers; examinations are administered by the individual State Public Service Commissions. Successful candidates are gazetted with the rank of Deputy Superintendent of Police and become members of their state police cadre. After a period of satisfactory service, state police service officers may be nominated to join the IPS at this rank or, if they receive further promotions, at the rank of Superintendent of Police. When State Police Service officers get promoted to IPS, their rank does not change. Generally, State Police Officers are paid more at the same rank when compared to their IPS counterparts, but IPS officers get promoted in less amount of time when compared to their SPS counterparts. When an SPS officer is promoted to an IPS officer, the salary usually decreases as the IPS counterpart holding a rank like SP normally gets less salary than his/her SPS counterpart.

State police forces and their structure
Each State Government's Home Department is not  responsible for its State Police force. Generally the administrative head of the Home Department of a state is an IAS officer in the rank of Additional Chief Secretary or Principal Secretary to State government. However, in many states IPS officers are appointed Home Secretaries.

Each state police force is headed by an IPS officer in the rank of Director General of Police. The head of a state police force has the designation of Director General of Police, and is assisted by one to several Additional or Special DGPs. Each Additional/Special DGP is responsible for a bureau within the state police (Law & Order, Crime, etc.). Some large state police forces, such as the Maharashtra Police, Tamil Nadu Police and Uttar Pradesh Police are generally divided into zones, ranges and commissionerates. However, even some large police forces such as Bihar Police don't have Police Commissionerates. Smaller state police forces, such as the Andaman and Nicobar Police or the Arunachal Pradesh Police, are typically only divided into ranges; however, this system of divisions can vary from force to force. Each range or zone is headed by an officer in the rank of Additional DGP or Inspector General of Police.

Commissionerates generally is not enerzing  encompass major cities that are so designated, such as Kolkata, Mumbai, Delhi, Chennai, Lucknow, Hyderabad, Ahmedabad etc. Each commissionerate has its own individual police force headed by an IPS officer with the designation of Commissioner of Police (CP). The Commissioner of Police may be of the rank of Additional DGP, ADGP or IGP but can also be in the rank of DIGP. The Commissioner of Police is empowered with the powers of an executive magistrate and functions as such. The Commissioner of Police is assisted by one to several Joint Commissioners of Police, who usually hold the rank of IGP (or Deputy IGP). Each is in charge of a bureau (Law and Order, Crime, etc.), mirroring the organisation of the state police as a whole. Below the JCPs, the organisation is typically as follows:
 Region: Headed by an IPS Additional Commissioner of Police (Addl. CP) in the rank of DIGP. Gazetted officers below the rank of DIGP may either be IPS or SPS officers.
 Zone: Each region is divided into a number of zones, each headed by an Additional Director General of Police (ADG) or Inspector General of Police (IG)
 Division: A zone usually contains one to two divisions, each headed by Inspector General of Police or DIGP.

The general organisation outside commissionerates is as follows:
 Zone: Headed by an IPS officer in the rank of ADG or IG
 Range: Headed by an IPS officer in the rank of IG or DIG
 District: Headed by a Senior Superintendent or a Superintendent of Police.
 Area: Headed by a Superintendent of Police, generally having a lower grade pay than the district head if the district head is an SSP.
 Sub Division: A sub division is headed by an officer of the rank of DSP or ASP. Which is called as SDPO (Sub Divisional Police Officer). In some states, there are a few circles under the Sub division. In some states a DSP, and in some states like Assam, an Inspector takes the charge of the Circle.
 Police station: Commanded by a non-gazetted police officer. In a city, an Inspector or Sub-inspector may be in charge of one police station. They are posted as Station House Officer and Station Officer respectively. The Inspector or sub-inspector commands several sub-inspectors (SI) or assistant sub-inspector and other low-ranked officials.
However, District Superintendents or Senior Superintendents of Police are not empowered with the powers of an executive magistrate, in Districts these powers, like promulgating Section 144, granting arms licenses, are exercised by the District Magistrate, who is an IAS officer.

Sub-inspectors (PSIs), the first police officers who may file a charge sheet, often command police stations in rural districts or police outposts or substations; in cities, they operate out of a police station and administer beats (chowkies). Sub-inspectors are assisted by assistant sub-inspectors (ASIs), who may also be in charge of chowkies, under them are head constables (senior constables), who lead teams of constables.

See also 
 Central Armed Police Forces ranks and insignia of India
 Paramilitary forces ranks and insignia of India
 Army ranks and insignia of India
 Air Force ranks and insignia of India
 Naval ranks and insignia of India
 Coast Guard ranks and insignia of India
 Border Roads Organisation ranks and insignia of India

Notes

References 

Police ranks of India
India government-related lists
Law enforcement-related lists